Waldine Amanda Tauch, (January 28, 1892 -March 31, 1986) was an American sculptor. She was chosen by the Texas Centennial Commission to create the monument "The First Shot Fired For Texas Independence".

Biography
Tauch born in Schulenburg, Texas to William and Elizabeth Heimann Tauch. Tauch's father was an early photographer in Texas.

Beginning in 1910 she left home to train in San Antonio with Italian-Texan sculptor Pompeo Coppini and her career was intertwined with his, as student, then apprentice, then partner.  Apart from two stints in Chicago (1919–1922) and New York City (1923–1935) she remained based in San Antonio.  Most of her sculptural work is in Texas.

Tauch was a member of art organizations, including the Society of Medalists, the Southern States Art League, the American Artists Professional League, the National Society of Arts and Letters, the San Antonio Art League, and the National Association of Women Painters and Sculptors.

1964 she was elected a fellow of the National Sculpture Society.

Tauch died on March 31, 1986 in San Antonio.

Selected works

Douglas MacArthur at Howard Payne University, Brownwood
Higher Education Reflects Responsibility to the World (1965),' at Trinity University, San Antonio
Texas Ranger of Today (1960), at the Union Terminal, Dallas
 Pippa Passes,  at Baylor University, Waco

References

External links
 In Memory of Waldine Tauch website
 The Coppini Academy of Fine Arts – San Antonio, Texas
 Texas Escapes Online Magazine Bio on William Tauch ( Father) and Family
Interview with Waldine Amanda Tauch, November 13, 1983. University of Texas at San Antonio: Institute of Texan Cultures: Oral History Collection, UA 15.01, University of Texas at San Antonio Libraries Special Collections.

1892 births
1986 deaths
American women sculptors
20th-century American sculptors
20th-century American women artists
People from Schulenburg, Texas
Sculptors from Texas